Jeremy Haun is a freelance comic book artist. Beginning in 2002, Haun worked for Image Comics, IDW Publishing, Oni Press, Devil's Due Publishing, Top Cow, and Marvel Comics. Since 2008, he has worked for DC Comics. He is best known for his work on Berserker and Battle Hymn.

External links

Living people
1975 births
American comics artists